Danann or Danaan may refer to:

Peoples
 Tuatha Dé Danann - a mythical people of Ireland
The Danaans (or Danaoi), another name used by Homer for the Achaeans
Denyen - a possible connection with late Bronze Age mention from Egypt and Amarna Letters

Music
 De Dannan - an Irish traditional folk music band
 Tuatha de Danann (band) - a Celtic folk metal band.

Other
 Danaan tactics, a fictional battle strategy in the animated series Star Wars Rebels
 TDD-1 - a fictional submarine from the anime/manga Full Metal Panic!

See also
 Danan (disambiguation)